Iroquois Peak is the eighth-highest peak in the Adirondack Mountains in New York State, U.S., and is part of the MacIntyre Range, which also includes Wright Peak, Mount Marshall, and Algonquin Peak. Although the mountain does not have an officially maintained trail, a well-maintained "herd path" leads to the summit from the northeast.

References

External links 
 

Mountains of Essex County, New York
Adirondack High Peaks
Mountains of New York (state)